International Junior Heavyweight Championship may refer to:

NWA International Junior Heavyweight Championship, originally formed as a split-off branch of the NWA World Junior Heavyweight Championship and defended mainly in All Japan Pro Wrestling
International Junior Heavyweight Championship (Zero1)
WAR International Junior Heavyweight Championship